Progress M-31 was a Russian unmanned Progress cargo spacecraft, which was launched in May 1996 to resupply the Mir space station.

Launch
Progress M-31 launched on 5 May 1996 from the Baikonur Cosmodrome in Kazakhstan. It used a Soyuz-U rocket.

Docking
Progress M-31 docked with the forward port of the Mir Core Module on 7 May 1996 at 08:54:19 UTC, and was undocked on 1 August 1996 at 16:44:54 UTC.

Decay
It remained in orbit until 1 August 1996, when it was deorbited. The deorbit burn occurred at 19:44:30 UTC and the mission ended at 20:33:03 UTC.

See also

 1996 in spaceflight
 List of Progress missions
 List of uncrewed spaceflights to Mir

References

Progress (spacecraft) missions
1996 in Kazakhstan
Spacecraft launched in 1996
Spacecraft which reentered in 1996
Spacecraft launched by Soyuz-U rockets